The World's Wonder View Tower was a tourist trap and roadside attraction located in Genoa, Colorado.  The tower was built in the mid-1920s by C.W. Gregory (known as Colorado's P.T. Barnum) and his partner Myrtle Le Bow. The promoters boasted that it is possible to see six states (Colorado, Kansas, Nebraska, Wyoming, New Mexico, and South Dakota) from the top of the tower. 

The tower is 65 feet tall.  The site it was built on was confirmed in 1934 to be the highest point between New York and Denver.  The tower is also a museum and vintage shop containing curiosities and novelty items such as a two-headed calf, an eight-legged pig, and more than 50,000 types of glass bottles.  The museum also contains historic American West artifacts and weapons, Native American arrowheads and other artifacts, and fossils.

The Tower is currently closed due to the death of the owner. The contents were publicly auctioned off on September 20th, 2014.

References

External links
World's Wonder View Tower
Photos on Flickr

American West museums in Colorado
Museums in Lincoln County, Colorado
Roadside attractions in Colorado
Defunct museums in Colorado
1920s establishments in Colorado